USS Coasters Harbor (AG-74) was a Basilan-class miscellaneous auxiliary acquired by the U.S. Navy during World War II. She was configured as a repair ship and sent to the Pacific Ocean just as the war ended. She was retained to participate in atomic testing at Bikini Atoll.

Constructed in Portland, Maine 
Coasters Harbor was launched 17 November 1944 by New England Shipbuilding Corporation, South Portland, Maine, under a U.S. Maritime Commission contract; sponsored by Mrs. M. M. Naples; transferred to the Navy 26 November 1944; commissioned the same day, ferried to Todd Shipbuilding Company, Brooklyn, New York; decommissioned 30 November 1944 for conversion to an electronics repair ship; and was recommissioned 29 July 1945.

World War II-related service 
Sailing from Norfolk, Virginia, 29 August, Coasters Harbor reached San Diego, California, 19 September and Sasebo, Japan, 31 October. She remained there servicing vessels of the occupation force until 5 March 1946.

Atomic testing at Bikini Atoll
Coasters Harbor sailed westward to take part in Operation Crossroads. Following the atomic weapons tests Coasters Harbor returned to the U.S. West Coast, arriving at San Pedro, California, 14 September.

Post-war decommissioning
She was placed out of commission in reserve at San Diego, California, 3 July 1947. She was redesignated AKS-22, 18 August 1951 and stricken from the Navy List on 1 April 1960.

References
  
 NavSource Online: Service Ship Photo Archive - USS Coasters Harbor (AG-74)

 

Basilan-class auxiliary ships
Ships built in Portland, Maine
1944 ships
World War II auxiliary ships of the United States
Liberty ships